Stromiec  is a village in Białobrzegi County, Masovian Voivodeship, in east-central Poland. It is the seat of the gmina (administrative district) called Gmina Stromiec. From 1975 to 1998 the village was in Radom Voivodeship.

In 2006 the village had a population of 909.

References

External links
 Jewish Community in Stromiec on Virtual Shtetl

Stromiec
Masovian Voivodeship (1526–1795)
Radom Governorate
Kielce Voivodeship (1919–1939)